Shablykino is a rural locality (a village) in Karinskoye Rural Settlement, Alexandrovsky District, Vladimir Oblast, Russia. The population was 75 as of 2010. There are 6 streets.

Geography 
Shablykino is located on the Peredyshka River, 17 km southwest of Alexandrov (the district's administrative centre) by road. Strunino is the nearest rural locality.

References 

Rural localities in Alexandrovsky District, Vladimir Oblast